Daniel John Rogerson (born 23 July 1975, St Austell) is a British Liberal Democrat politician. He was the Member of Parliament (MP) for North Cornwall from the 2005 general election until his defeat at the 2015 general election. In October 2013, he became the Liberal Democrat Minister at the Department for Environment, Food and Rural Affairs, holding the office until losing his Parliamentary seat to Conservative candidate Scott Mann.

Early life and career 
Born in Cornwall, Rogerson grew up in Bodmin, attending Bodmin College (comprehensive school), before studying Politics at the University of Wales Aberystwyth. Whilst a student, Rogerson worked at the Proper Cornish pasty factory in Bodmin.

Dan Rogerson joined the Liberal Democrats whilst still at school in 1991 to help fight for the election of Paul Tyler at the 1992 general election.

He worked at Bedford Borough Council before being elected to the Council himself in 1999 for the ward of Kingsbook.
He served as councillor, and later Deputy Group Leader, until 2002. Following his election as a local councillor he worked in University administration.

Rogerson first stood for Parliament in 2001, contesting the North East Bedfordshire seat, increasing the Liberal Democrats' share of the vote by 2.1%.

Political career
In 2005 he was elected for the North Cornwall seat and used the Cornish language during the swearing of allegiance in Parliament along with Andrew George in an effort to support the preservation of Cornish identity and culture. In 2006 Rogerson asked the government to make 5 March a public holiday in Cornwall to recognise celebrations for St Piran's Day.

Rogerson was chair of the All-Party Parliamentary Group on cheese, and opposed Ofcom's inclusion of cheese in its new regulations restricting television advertising of junk foods to children aged under 16.

He was also a member of the All-Party Parliamentary Group on religious education.

On 14 July 2009, Dan Rogerson presented a Cornish "breakaway" Bill to Parliament. The Bill proposed a devolved Cornish Assembly, similar to the Welsh and Scottish set-up.

He was Liberal Democrat Shadow Minister for Communities and Local Government until the 2010 election and was the youngest male MP in the House of Commons during the 2005–2010 Parliament.

He was appointed the co-chair of the Liberal Democrat Parliamentary Committee for Education, Families and Young People in July 2010.

In the 2010 general election Dan Rogerson successfully held his seat in North Cornwall with a majority of 6.36%. He repeated his parliamentary oath in Cornish as he did after the previous election.

In December 2010, Rogerson was one of the twenty-one Liberal Democrat MPs who voted against the tuition fee rise.

Following a government reshuffle, Rogerson was appointed Parliamentary Under-Secretary of State for Water, Forestry, Resource Management and Rural Affairs at the Department for Environment, Food and Rural Affairs, a role he held until the 2015 general election.

Rogerson stood for re-election as MP for North Cornwall, but was defeated by Conservative candidate Scott Mann by 6,621 votes - a swing of over 9,000.

In July 2018, Rogerson announced that he would not contest the North Cornwall seat again at the next general election and that a new Liberal Democrat candidate would have to be selected.

At the 2021 Cornwall Council election, he was a candidate for the Launceston South ward, but was defeated by a margin of 3 votes.

Personal life
He married Heidi Purser in August 1999 in Bodmin. They have two sons and one daughter. They were divorced in 2021.

See also

 List of topics related to Cornwall
 Cornish Assembly

References

External links
 Dan Rogerson MP official constituency website
 Profile at the Liberal Democrats

 Cornish Assembly official website

1975 births
Living people
UK MPs 2005–2010
UK MPs 2010–2015
Members of the Parliament of the United Kingdom for North Cornwall
Politicians from Cornwall
People from St Austell
Liberal Democrats (UK) MPs for English constituencies
Alumni of Aberystwyth University
Cornish nationalists
People from Bodmin
Councillors in Bedfordshire
Liberal Democrats (UK) councillors